Kevin Patrick Wacholz (born April 17, 1958) is an American retired professional wrestler. He is best known for his appearances with the World Wrestling Federation (WWF) in 1992 under the ring name Nailz. He is also known for his appearances with the American Wrestling Association (AWA) in the 1980s as "Mr. Magnificent" Kevin Kelly.

Professional wrestling career

Early career (1982–1986) 
Wacholz started wrestling in 1982 after winning a Toughman Contest. He wrestled in various territories in Tennessee, Montreal, Central States, and the Pacific Northwest.

In 1985 he wrestled as Thor for World Class Championship Wrestling in Texas. Had feuds with Bobby Fulton and Brian Adias. That same year he worked with the same gimmick for Bill Watts' Mid-South Wrestling.

In 1986 he worked for New Japan Pro-Wrestling.

American Wrestling Association (1984–1988) 
Wacholz debut in the American Wrestling Association (AWA) as Kevin Kelly in 1984, as a babyface midcarder. By 1986, he was a top heel and challenged for the AWA World Heavyweight Championship. He used the moniker, "Mr. Magnificent" Kevin Kelly.

In 1987, he was managed by Sherri Martel and regularly issued arm wrestling challenges. This led to a feud with Tommy Rich, who answered one of his challenges on an edition of AWA Championship Wrestling on ESPN. Rich appeared to have the contest won, when Martel interfered on Kelly's behalf. In retaliation, Rich tore off her dress.  Rich would then dominate a series of matches between the two.

In 1988, "Nailz" and teammate Curt Henning "Mr. Perfect", were beat in a game of foosball by Mr. Randy Paulson and a unknown teammate in a small town Minnesota dive bar.

After Martel left the AWA, Kelly took Madusa Miceli as his manager. He often teamed with Nick Kiniski as "The Perfect Tag Team" to contend for the AWA World Tag Team Championship.

He left the AWA in 1988, before it folded in 1991.

Frontier Martial-Arts Wrestling (1990)
In June 1990, Kelly returned to Japan for Frontier Martial-Arts Wrestling where he had a feud with Dick Murdoch.

World Wrestling Federation (1989, 1991, 1992)
Wacholz, still performing under the name Kevin Kelly, received a tryout match on June 6, 1989, at a WWF Superstars taping in Madison, WI, defeating Tim Horner. A night later he defeated Jim Powers at a Wrestling Challenge taping, but was not signed to a contract that year. After the AWA folded, Wacholz received another tryout match, this time at a WWF Superstars taping on May 6, 1991, defeating Brian Costello. The following night at a Wrestling Challenge taping he defeated Gary Jackson in a dark match.

In early 1992, Wacholz returned to the WWF as Nailz, an ex-convict who, in a series of promos, alleged he was abused by former prison guard Big Boss Man during his incarceration. He also claimed to be innocent of his (unspecified) crimes. Following Big Boss Man's squash of Dave Roulette on the May 30 episode of WWF Superstars of Wrestling, Nailz (dressed in an orange prison jumpsuit) attacked Boss Man, handcuffing him to the top rope before repeatedly hitting and choking him with his own nightstick. Nailz easily defeated numerous jobbers en route to defeating Boss Man's ally Virgil at SummerSlam. He attacked Sgt. Slaughter before a match that ended in a no contest in September 1992. He continued to feud with Boss Man, who had recovered from Nailz's beating. The feud came to its climax when Big Boss Man defeated Nailz in a nightstick match at Survivor Series. Before Nailz finished the feud with Boss Man, he began another feud, this time with The Undertaker.  The two had a stare down on the October 24 episode of Superstars, a photo of which was used as the cover of the January 1993 issue of WWF Magazine. He had a few matches losing to WWF Champion Bret Hart. Also he had a short feud with The Ultimate Warrior.

Wacholz was released from his WWF contract in December 1992, after he attacked Vince McMahon in his office over a financial dispute, while John Nord watched the door. The incident occurred on December 14 during a house show in Green Bay, Wisconsin. Bret Hart recalled in his autobiography that Wacholz "cornered Vince in his office and screamed at him for fifteen minutes". Hart claims he was just down the hall from the office when he heard a loud crash, which was Wacholz "knocking Vince over in his chair, choking him violently". The incident led to a series of lawsuits between Wacholz and the WWF. Wacholz alleged McMahon had given him steroids on a number of occasions; McMahon denied the claim. Wacholz then filed a wrongful termination lawsuit claiming McMahon sexually assaulted him. The WWF filed a counterclaim against Wacholz, but both suits were later dropped. In 1994, Wacholz testified against McMahon during his trial on charges of supplying steroids to WWF wrestlers. He claimed McMahon had told him to take steroids.

World Championship Wrestling (1993, 1997–1998) 
After getting fired from the WWF, Wacholz appeared at World Championship Wrestling's (WCW) Slamboree event in 1993 as "The Prisoner" (looking identical to his Nailz persona), losing to Sting.

He returned to WCW for several appearances over a six-month period from 1997 to 1998. His return began on October 6, 1997, when he defeated Yugi Nagata in a dark match on Monday Night Nitro. His last appearance was on April 17, 1998, where he defeated Barry Darsow at a house show.

Late career (1993–2001) 
After WCW, Wacholz began working in the independent circuit.

From 1993 to 1997 he worked for Pro Wrestling America in Minnesota where he feuded with Road Warrior Hawk.

He was World Wide Wrestling Alliance's heavyweight champion in 1994. He dropped the title to Brutus Beefcake on April 16.

He wrestled in Jim Crockett's short-lived promotion, WWN, in 1994, as "The Convict". He also wrestled for New Japan Pro-Wrestling that year, as D.O.C. Nelson and Nailz. Teamed with Ron Simmons.

In 1996, Wacholz appeared in Paul Alperstein's American Wrestling Federation as Nails (pronounced like "Nailz") alongside many WWF wrestlers from the 1980s and 1990s who were also wrestling in that promotion. On November 1, 1997, he lost to Jimmy Snuka at World Wrestling Alliance in Fort Lewis, Washington.

His last match was a loss to Matt Burns by disqualification on August 25, 2001, at an independent show in Orrock, Minnesota. After that, Wacholz officially retired from wrestling, later disappeared.

Championships and accomplishments 
Oregon Wrestling Federation
OWF Heavyweight Champion (1 time)
World Wide Wrestling Alliance
WWWA Heavyweight Championship (1 time)
Pro Wrestling Illustrated
PWI ranked him #78 of the top 500 singles wrestlers in the PWI 500 in 1992
PWI ranked him #336 of the top 500 singles wrestlers of the "PWI Years" in 2003

References

External links 
 
 

1958 births
American male professional wrestlers
Living people
People from Bloomington, Minnesota
Professional wrestlers from Minnesota
20th-century professional wrestlers